Donje Mrzlo Polje Mrežničko (lit. "Lower Cold Field of Mrežnica") is a village in Croatia.

Populated places in Karlovac County